Ambleminae is a subfamily of freshwater mussel in the family Unionidae. They are found throughout much of eastern North America south to Central America, although fossils are also known from Siberia. Some species have also been introduced to East Asia. They are the most speciose radiation of the Unionidae, with more than 300 species.

Fossils of this group date back to the Late Cretaceous.

Systematics 
The following classification is based on MolluscaBase and the MUSSEL Project database:

 Tribe Amblemini Rafinesque, 1820
 Genus Amblema Rafinesque, 1820
 Genus Plectomerus Conrad, 1853
 Genus Regianaia D. C. Campbell & Lydeard, 2012
 Tribe Lampsilini Ihering, 1901
 Genus Actinonaias Crosse & P. Fischer, 1894
 Genus Arotonaias E. von Martens, 1900
 Genus Atlanticoncha C. H. Smith, J. M. Pfeiffer & N. A. Johnson, 2020
 Genus Cambarunio Watters, 2018
 Genus Cyprogenia Agassiz, 1852
 Genus Cyrtonaias Crosse & P. Fischer, 1894
 Genus Delphinonaias Crosse & P. Fischer, 1894
 Genus Disconaias Crosse & P. Fischer, 1894
 Genus Dromus C. T. Simpson, 1900
 Genus Ellipsaria Rafinesque, 1820
 Genus Epioblasma Rafinesque, 1831
 Genus Friersonia Ortmann, 1912
 Genus Glebula Conrad, 1853
 Genus Hamiota Roe & Hartfield, 2005
 Genus Lampsilis Rafinesque, 1820
 Genus Leaunio Watters, 2018
 Genus Lemiox Rafinesque, 1831
 Genus †Lenelliptio C. M. Kolesnikov, 1980 (Late Cretaceous of Siberia)
 Genus Ligumia Swainson, 1840
 Genus Medionidus C. T. Simpson, 1900
 Genus Obliquaria Rafinesque, 1820
 Genus Obovaria Rafinesque, 1819
 Genus Ortmanniana Frierson, 1927
 Genus Pachynaias Crosse & P. Fischer, 1894
 Genus Paetulunio Watters, 2018
 Genus Potamilus Rafinesque, 1818
 Genus Ptychobranchus C. T. Simpson, 1900
 Genus Sagittunio Watters, 2018
 Genus Toxolasma Rafinesque, 1831
 Genus Truncilla Rafinesque, 1819
 Genus Venustaconcha Frierson, 1927
 Genus Villosa Frierson, 1927
 Tribe Pleurobemini Hannibal, 1912
 Genus Elliptio Rafinesque, 1819
 Genus Elliptoideus Frierson, 1927
 Genus Eurynia Rafinesque, 1819
 Genus Fusconaia C. T. Simpson, 1900
 Genus Hemistena Rafinesque, 1820
 Genus Parvaspina Perkins, N. A. Johnson & Gangloff, 2017
 Genus Plethobasus C. T. Simpson, 1900
 Genus Pleurobema Rafinesque, 1819
 Genus Pleuronaia Frierson, 1927
 Tribe Popenaiadini Heard & Guckert, 1970
 Genus Barynaias Crosse & P. Fischer, 1894
 Genus Martensnaias Frierson, 1927
 Genus Micronaias C. T. Simpson, 1900
 Genus Nephritica Frierson, 1927
 Genus Nephronaias Crosse & P. Fischer, 1894
 Genus Popenaias Frierson, 1927
 Genus Psoronaias Crosse & P. Fischer, 1894
 Genus Psorula F. Haas, 1930
 Genus Reticulatus Frierson, 1927
 Genus Sphenonaias Crosse & P. Fischer, 1894
 Tribe Quadrulini Ihering, 1901
 Genus Cyclonaias Pilsbry, 1922
 Genus †Eonaias W. B. Marshall, 1929 (Pliocene of Texas)
 Genus Megalonaias Utterback, 1915
 Genus †Proparreysia Pilsbry, 1921 (Late Cretaceous of Colorado)
 Genus †Protamblema Modell, 1957 (Late Cretaceous of Wyoming)
 Genus Quadrula Rafinesque, 1820
 Genus Theliderma Swainson, 1840
 Genus Tritogonia Agassiz, 1852
 Genus Uniomerus Conrad, 1853

References 

Unionidae
Protostome subfamilies
Taxa named by Constantine Samuel Rafinesque